Greg Stekelman (born 12 February 1975 in London) is a British novelist and writer.

Life

Born and raised in north London, Stekelman started themanwhofellasleep.com in 2001. The website is an eclectic mix of his writing, illustrations, animations and features. The website is popular in the UK and has featured in a number of newspapers, from The Guardian to the Sunday Times.

In 2005 Time Out London started using his Tube Gossip column as a weekly feature under the heading Overheard Underground. April 2006 saw The Friday Project releasing Stekelman's first novel; A Year in the Life of TheManWhoFellAsleep, based on writing from his website.  

Reviews of A Year in the Life of TheManWhoFellAsleep have been positive, with Time Out London saying "This odd, excellent, fantastical diary offers a curious combination of dreams, London and deadpan humour, all wrapped in up in a quasi-fictional journal with funny illustrations".Vice Magazine UK called it "...one of the most imaginative and enjoyable diaries published since Brian Eno's A Year with Swollen Appendices" and described Stekelman as a "Woody Allen for the iPod generation" . Zoo Magazine described it as a "surreal, morbidly entertaining novel written as a diary".

Stekelman's second book, London Tales, was published in November 2011 by Timeline Books.

External links 
 Themanwhofellasleep website
Excerpts from A Year in the Life of The Man Who Fell Asleep in Litro magazine.
Interview in Le Cool Magazine
Profile on Normblog
Rhodri Marsden interviews Greg Stekelman

1975 births
Alumni of the University of Leeds
21st-century English novelists
Living people
People from Muswell Hill
English male novelists
21st-century English male writers